"I Believe" is a popular song written by Ervin Drake, Irvin Graham (a pseudonym used by Irvin Abraham), Jimmy Shirl (a pseudonym for Jack Mendelsohn) and Al Stillman in 1953. The most popular version was recorded by Italian-American singer Frankie Laine, and spent eighteen weeks at No. 1 on the UK Singles Chart.

Background
"I Believe" was commissioned and introduced by Jane Froman on her television show, and became the first hit song ever introduced on TV. Froman, troubled by the uprising of the Korean War in 1952 so soon after World War II, asked Drake, Graham, Shirl and Stillman to compose a song that would offer hope and faith to the populace. Froman's commercial recording reached No. 11 in the Billboard charts during a 10-week stay. "I Believe" has been recorded by many others, and has become both a popular and religious standard.

Frankie Laine recording

Frankie Laine's original version was recorded for Columbia Records on 8 January 1953 at Radio Recorders in Hollywood. It featured Paul Weston and his Orchestra accompanying Laine.

Laine's recording spent eighteen non-consecutive weeks at the top of the UK Singles Chart. , this record remains unbeaten. "I Believe" was the best-selling single of 1953 in the UK, spending 36 weeks on the chart. It entered the listings on 3 April 1953, and first reached No. 1 in its fourth week on chart, spending nine weeks at the top. On 26 June, it was replaced at No. 1 for a week by "I'm Walking Behind You" by Eddie Fisher featuring Sally Sweetland, but returned to the top spot on 3 July for another six weeks. On 14 August, it was again replaced at the top for a week, this time by Mantovani's "Song From the Moulin Rouge". On 21 August, "I Believe" returned to No. 1 for its final run at the top, for three weeks, bringing its total time at No. 1 to eighteen weeks. Laine also had the most successful version in the US, where his recording reached No. 2, staying there for three weeks.

Laine would later re-record the song for other labels on a number of occasions. The first of these was on December 18, 1964 in Hollywood, with orchestra arranged and conducted by Ralph Carmichael. The recording was released on the Capitol album I Believe the following year. A recording made by Laine on February 25, 1970 for Amos Records in Hollywood, with orchestra arranged by Jimmie Haskell, was issued on the album Frankie Laine's Greatest Hits that year. In June 1977, with Pete Moore's Orchestra and Ray Barr on piano, Laine recorded "I Believe" for a fourth label. This version was included on the Polydor album 20 Memories in Gold, an album largely consisting of re-recordings of his earlier hits, which was released in September that year. In May 1980, Laine recorded "I Believe" at a session of his hit re-recordings used by K-Tel. The recordings were backed by an orchestra conducted by Don Jackson with The Worlettes, and released on the 1982 album The Music Of Frankie Laine. "I Believe" was also recorded as part of a different collection of Laine hit remakes in January 1982, again with the Don Jackson Orchestra. This album, The World Of Frankie Laine, was released by Ronco the same year. In all, Laine recorded "I Believe" for six different record companies over a period spanning from 1953 to 1982.

Contemporary chart performance and recordings 
In the US, only the versions by Froman and Laine charted, whilst only Laine's charted in the UK. It was commonplace at the time for multiple artists to record versions of a new song, and others were released. In the UK, "I Believe" entered the sheet music sales chart on 11 April 1953, and reached No. 1 on 13 June, its tenth week on chart. It spent a week at the top, and returned on 24 October for another week, with a total of two weeks at No. 1 on the sheet music chart.

The Frankie Laine version was the first to be issued in the UK, in February 1953. April saw recordings by Jane Froman, Ronnie Ronalde and David Whitfield. Subsequent releases were of versions by Eve Boswell, Allan Jones, Victor Silvester and his Ballroom Orchestra, and Ethel Smith (organ). The song spent forty weeks on the sheet music sales chart, whilst Laine's recording was on the singles chart for 36 weeks.

Other notable recordings

Louis Armstrong - included in his album I Will Wait for You (1968).
The Bachelors took the song to the No. 2 spot in the UK in 1964. This version also peaked at No. 33 on the US Hot 100.
Brook Benton & Dinah Washington - included in their album Two of Us (1960).
Pat Boone - The Lord's Prayer (And Other Great Hymns) (1964).
Glen Campbell - for his album Oh Happy Day (1970).
Perry Como - I Believe ~ Songs of All Faiths Sung by Perry Como (1953).
The Earls  - included in the album "Remember Me" (1965).
 Eddie Fisher sang the song before a live television audience of 60 million viewers (broadcast live over the NBC and CBS networks) as part of The Ford 50th Anniversary Show.
Mahalia Jackson - a single release in 1953, later included in the album The World's Greatest Gospel Singer (1956).
Joni James - included in the album "Give Us This Day" (1957).
Tom Jones - Tom Jones Live! At the Talk of the Town (1967).
Daniel O'Donnell - I Believe (1997).
Elvis Presley - for his EP Peace in the Valley (1957). Later included on the album Elvis' Christmas Album (1957).
Johnnie Ray & Timi Yuro - a single release in 1961.
Reparata and the Delrons - 45 RPM single Mala 573. (1967).
Cissy Houston - for her album Presenting Cissy Houston (1970).
Robson & Jerome's version reached number one in the UK in 1995.
Jimmie Rodgers - included on the album The Number One Ballads (1958).
David Whitfield recorded the song in 1953, and again in 1960. Only the latter recording appeared in the UK Singles Chart, peaking at No.49. Both were issued by Decca Records.
Andy Williams - for his album The Village of St. Bernadette (1960).
Roy Hamilton - a single release in 1955.
B.J. Thomas - for his album Amazing Grace (1981).
Barbra Streisand - included "I Believe" as a medley with "You’ll Never Walk Alone," as the first selection on her album Higher Ground (1997).
Gary Valenciano for his album Revive (2000).
Martin Nievera included "I Believe" as a medley with "The Lord's Prayer (Our Father)," for the grand finale of his 17th anniversary concert (2001).

Quodlibet with Ave Maria
In 1972, Shawnee Music published a new arrangement of "I Believe" that includes a quodlibet with Bach/Gounod, "Ave Maria". This version is frequently performed by choirs at Christmas time.

References

External links
 
 

1953 songs
1953 singles
1964 singles
Glen Campbell songs
Frankie Laine songs
The Bachelors songs
Timi Yuro songs
London Records singles
Gospel songs
UK Singles Chart number-one singles
Number-one singles in Scotland